Mestranol/hydroxyprogesterone acetate (ME/OHPA), sold under the brand name Hormolidin, is a combination medication of mestranol (ME), an estrogen, and hydroxyprogesterone acetate (OHPA), a progestin, which was reportedly used as a sequential combined birth control pill for women in the early 1970s. It was formulated as oral tablets and contained 16 tablets of 80 μg ME, 5 tablets of 80 μg ME and 100 mg OHPA, and 7 placebo tablets (28 tablets in total). The medication was manufactured by the pharmaceutical company Gador in Argentina.

See also
 List of combined sex-hormonal preparations § Estrogens and progestogens

References

Abandoned drugs
Combined estrogen–progestogen formulations